Krasnoarmeysky District is an administrative and municipal district (raion), one of the twenty-seven in Samara Oblast, Russia. It is located in the southwest of the oblast. Its administrative center is the rural locality (a selo) of Krasnoarmeyskoye. Population: 18,050 (2010 Census);  The population of Krasnoarmeyskoye accounts for 29.6% of the district's total population.

References

Notes

Sources

Districts of Samara Oblast